Evgeny Stanev (born 25 September 1979) is a Russian judoka.

Achievements

References

External links
 
 

1979 births
Living people
Russian male judoka
Judoka at the 2000 Summer Olympics
Judoka at the 2004 Summer Olympics
Olympic judoka of Russia
21st-century Russian people